Francis Edward Cotton (born 3 January 1947) is a former rugby union prop forward who played for England and the British Lions. His clubs included Coventry R.F.C. and Sale.  After retiring, he remained in rugby administration and founded a clothing company. In 2007, Cotton returned to his former club Sale as a member of the club's board.

Cotton was born in Wigan, Lancashire, and went to Loughborough University to study physical education.  Cotton was ahead of his time in terms of physical preparation.  It was during these years that Cotton would win the Glengarth Sevens at Stockport Rugby Club along with Steve Smith and Clive Rees.
Cotton made his England debut against Scotland in 1971, and played for them 31 times. He also captained the English team three times.

He represented the Lions on their tours to South Africa in 1974, New Zealand in 1977 and South Africa in 1980. It was during the game against the Junior All Blacks on the 1977 tour that the famous 'Mudman' image of Cotton, waiting for the ball at a lineout while caked head-to-toe in mud, was taken. Captured by Colorsport's Colin Elsey, it became one of the most iconic images of rugby union.

Cotton was the Tour Manager for the 1997 British Lions tour to South Africa.

With Steve Smith he founded the clothing company Cotton Traders in 1987. In 2008 Cotton Traders was forced to pull out of Burma after an investigation by the Burma Campaign UK uncovered the company was sourcing clothing from Burma. Clothing exports generate significant income for the Burmese dictatorship.

Charitable work
He is an honorary president of the rugby charity Wooden Spoon improving the lives of disadvantaged children and young people in Britain and Ireland.

References

External links
Sporting heroes 1

1947 births
Living people
Alumni of Loughborough University
British & Irish Lions rugby union players from England
British businesspeople
Coventry R.F.C. players
England international rugby sevens players
England international rugby union players
English rugby union players
English sportswriters
Lancashire County RFU players
Loughborough Students RUFC players
Male rugby sevens players
North of England Rugby Union team
Rugby union players from Wigan
Rugby union props
Liverpool St Helens F.C. players